Zyen Jones (born August 25, 2000) is an American soccer player who plays as a winger for Tromsø, on loan from Ferencváros II.

Career

Club
After spending time in the Atlanta United FC academy, Jones moved to German side Schalke 04 in 2018. After playing with their under-19 team, Jones returned to the United States and joined USL Championship side Charlotte Independence on April 19, 2019. He was released by Charlotte on January 20, 2020.

After several months without club, he joined Hungarian side Ferencváros in October 2020, playing for their reserve team.

International
Jones has been capped at the U-17 and U-20 levels for the USA youth national team. He is also eligible to play for Jamaica via his Jamaican father.

References

External links
 

2000 births
Living people
People from Clarkston, Georgia
Sportspeople from DeKalb County, Georgia
Soccer players from Georgia (U.S. state)
American expatriate soccer players
American soccer players
United States men's youth international soccer players
United States men's under-20 international soccer players
American sportspeople of Jamaican descent
Association football midfielders
Charlotte Independence players
Ferencvárosi TC footballers
FC Spartak Trnava players
USL Championship players
Nemzeti Bajnokság III players
Slovak Super Liga players
Expatriate footballers in Hungary
American expatriate sportspeople in Hungary
Expatriate footballers in Slovakia
American expatriate sportspeople in Slovakia